Çatören Dam is a dam in Turkey, located on the Seydisuyu river basin. The development was backed by the Turkish State Hydraulic Works.

See also
List of dams and reservoirs in Turkey

References

Bibliography

 

Dams in Eskişehir Province